Francis McLellan Wilcox (1865–1951) was a Seventh-day Adventist minister, administrator and editor of the Review and Herald (now the Adventist Review) for 33 years.

Biography
He was an early student of South Lancaster Academy (today Atlantic Union College). After graduation he spent four years in evangelism in New York (1886-1890). On July 16, 1889, he was ordained at the Rome, New York, camp meeting presided over by Ellen G. White. During the 1890s he served in a variety of editorial posts. From 1897 to 1909 he served as chaplain at the Colorado Sanitarium located in Boulder, Colorado. In 1909 he became associate editor of the Review and Herald, and two years later became editor (a post he would hold until his retirement in 1944). During his tenure as editor he served for a time as president of the Review and Herald Publishing Association. He was one of the original members of the Ellen G. White Estate board of trustees appointed by Ellen G. White and later served as chairman of their board. Wilcox was also one of the participants of the 1919 Bible Conference.

Books published

Facing the Crisis (1920)
The Fall of Jerusalem (1920?)
The Coming Crisis (1933)
What the Bible Teaches (1926)
The Testimony of Jesus (1934)
The Gospel of Health (1935)
Seventh-day Adventists in Time of War (1936)
Day by Day: a compilation of Bible texts and topics (1937)
The Early and Latter Rain (1938)
The More Abundant Life (1939)
Quit Yourselves Like Men: an open letter to our young men in camp and field (1940)
Heart-to-Heart Talks (1948)
Divine Revelation (194-?)

See also

 History of the Seventh-day Adventist Church

References

External links
 Seventh-day Adventists in Time of War (requires freely available DjVu reader)

1865 births
1951 deaths
Seventh-day Adventist religious workers
Ellen G. White Estate
American Seventh-day Adventists
American Seventh-day Adventist ministers
Seventh-day Adventist administrators
History of the Seventh-day Adventist Church